Komsomol is a rural locality (a village) in Zilairsky Selsoviet, Baymaksky District, Bashkortostan, Russia. The population was 222 as of 2010. There are 5 streets.

Geography 
Komsomol is located 64 km southeast of Baymak (the district's administrative centre) by road. Urgaza is the nearest rural locality.

References 

Rural localities in Baymaksky District